CUGBP, Elav-like family member 2, also known as Etr-3 is a protein that in humans is encoded by the CELF2 gene.

Members of the CELF/BRUNOL protein family are RNA-binding proteins and contain two N-terminal RNA recognition motif (RRM) domains, one C-terminal RRM domain, and a divergent segment of 160-230 aa between the second and third RRM domains. Members of this protein family regulate pre-mRNA alternative splicing and may also be involved in mRNA editing, and translation. Alternative splicing results in multiple transcript variants encoding different isoforms.

Interactions
CUGBP2 has been shown to interact with A1CF.

References

External links

Further reading